Thomas John Evans was Archdeacon of Carmarthen from 1974 until his death in 1982.

Evans was born in 1914, educated at St David's College, Lampeter, and ordained in 1944. After curacies in Dafen and Llanelly he was Vicar of Llangunnor until his Archdeacon’s appointment.

References

1914 births
1982 deaths
Alumni of the University of Wales, Lampeter
Archdeacons of Carmarthen